

References

N